The 1966 Michigan gubernatorial election was held on November 8, 1966. Incumbent Republican George W. Romney defeated Democratic nominee Zolton Ferency with 60.54% of the vote.

General election

Candidates
Major party candidates
George W. Romney, Republican
Zolton Ferency, Democratic

Major party running mates
William Milliken, Republican
John B. Bruff, Democratic

Other candidates
James Horvath, Socialist Labor

Other running mates
W. Clifford Bentley, Socialist Labor

Results

Primary elections

The primary elections occurred on August 2, 1966.

Democratic primary

Republican primary

References

1966
Michigan
Gubernatorial
November 1966 events in the United States
George W. Romney